Lauri is an Estonian and Finnish male given name. It can also be a surname.

It may refer to the following people:

Actors 

 Lauri Lagle (born 1981), Estonian actor, director and screenwriter
 Lauri Nebel (born 1948), Estonian actor and magician
 Lauri Pedaja (born 1987), Estonian actor
 Lauri Tilkanen (born 1987), Finnish actor

Business 

 Lauri Kivekäs (1903–1998), Finnish businessman (Nokia)
 Lauri Rapala (1905–1974), Finnish businessman (Rapala fishing lures)

Film and videomakers 

 Lauri Harjola (also known as Renny Harlin) (born 1959), Finnish film director
 Lauri Törhönen (born 1947), Finnish film director
 Lauri Vuohensilta (born 1986/87), Finnish machinist best known as creator of YouTube's Hydraulic Press Channel

Literature 

 Lauri Hussar (born 1973), Estonian journalist
 Lauri Pilter (born 1971), Estonian writer, translator and literary scientist
 Lauri Soininen (1875–1919), Finnish poet and journalist
 Lauri Sommer (born 1973), Estonian writer and musician
 Lauri Viita (1916–1965), Finnish poet
 Lauri Viljanen (1900–1994), Finnish literary critic and writer

Military 

 Lauri Heino (1918–2001), Finnish Army Sergeant of World War II 
 Lauri Malmberg (1888–1948), Finnish Army General 
 Lauri Nissinen (1918–1944) Finnish World War II flying ace
 Lauri Pekuri (1916-1999), Finnish aviator, World War II flying ace, jet aircraft pioneer
 Lauri Sutela (1918–2011), Finnish military officer
 Lauri Tiainen (1891–1958), Finnish Army Colonel 
 Lauri Törni (1919–1965), Finnish Army captain, served in the Waffen SS and United States Army

Musicians 

 Lauri Jõeleht (born 1974), Estonian composer
 Lauri Markkula (member of Negative (Finnish band))
 Lauri Õunapuu (born 1976), Estonian musician (Metsatöll)
 Lauri Penttilä (born 1979), also known as Werwolf, Finnish musician (Satanic Warmaster)
 Lauri Pihlap (born 1982), Estonian singer 
 Lauri Porra (born 1977), Finnish bassist (Stratovarius)
 Lauri Sirp (born 1969), Estonian conductor
 Lauri Tähkä (born 1973), Finnish musician (Lauri Tähkä & Elonkerjuu) 
 Lauri Ylönen (born 1979), Finnish singer, musician (The Rasmus)

Politicians 

 Lauri Einer (born 1931), Estonian politician
 Lauri Heikkilä (born 1957), Finnish parliamentarian
 Lauri Ihalainen (born 1947), Finnish trade union leader and politician
 Lauri Ingman (1868–1934), Prime Minister of Finland 1918–1919 and 1924–1925, Archbishop of Finland 1930–1934
 Lauri Lepik (born 1960), Estonian diplomat and civil servant
 Lauri Läänemets (born 1983), Estonian politician
 Lauri Laasi (born 1974), Estonian politician
 Lauri Letonmäki (1886–1935), Finnish communist politician
 Lauri Luik (born 1982), Estonian politician
 Lauri Kristian Relander (1883–1942), President of Finland 1925-1931
 Lauri Vahtre (born 1960), Estonian politician, historian, translator and writer

Science and education
 Lauri Hakulinen (1899–1985), Finnish linguist and educator
 Lauri Karttunen (1941–2022), Finnish linguist
 Lauri Honko (1932–2002), Finnish religious academic, folklorist and educator
 Lauri Kaila, Finnish entomologist and researcher of biodiversity
 Lauri Vaska (1925–2015), Estonian chemist

Sportsmen 

Athletics
 Lauri Halonen (1894–1961), Finnish track and field athlete and Olympic competitor
 Lauri Härö (1899–1980), Finnish sprinter, track and field athlete and Olympic competitor
 Lauri Kettunen (1905–1941), Finnish fencer, modern pentathlete and Olympic competitor
 Lauri Kyöstilä (1896–1984), Finnish diver and Olympic competitor
 Lauri Leis (born 1978), Estonian triple jumper and Olympic competitor
 Lauri Lehtinen (1908–1973), Finnish track and field athlete and Olympic medalist 
 Lauri Lelumees (born 1978), Estonian race walker
 Lauri Nevalainen (1927– 2005), Finnish rower and Olympic medalist
 Lauri Pihkala (1888–1981), Finnish inventor of pesäpallo, track and field athlete, Olympic competitor 
 Lauri Sild (born 1990), Estonian orienteer
 Lauri Tanner (1890–1950), Finnish gymnast, football player and Olympic medalist
 Lauri Vilkko (1925–2017), Finnish modern pentathlete and Olympic medalist 
 Lauri Virtanen (1904–1982), Finnish long-distance runner, track and field athlete, Olympic medalist

Basketball
 Lauri Markkanen (born 1997), Finnish basketball player in NBA 

Cycling
 Lauri Aus (1970–2003), Estonian cyclist and Olympic competitor
 Lauri Resik (born 1969), Estonian cyclist and Olympic competitor

Ice Hockey
 Lauri Kärmeniemi (born 1991), Finnish player for HPK 
 Lauri Korpikoski, (born 1986), Finnish player for the Phoenix Coyotes
 Lauri Lahesalu (born 1979), Estonian player for Dragons de Rouen 
 Lauri Mononen (1950–2018), Finnish winger 
 Lauri Tukonen (born 1986), Finnish player for Lukko and the Los Angeles Kings
 Lauri Taipalus (born 1988), Finnish player for JYP Jyvaskyla

Football
 Lauri Dalla Valle (born 1991), Finnish striker for K. Sint-Truidense V.V.
 Lauri Pirhonen (born 1984), Finnish goalkeeper for FC Jazz

Skiing
 Lauri Asikainen (born 1989), Finnish Nordic combined athlete
 Lauri Hakola (born 1979), Finnish ski jumper 
 Lauri Pyykönen (born 1978), Finnish cross-country skier and Olympic competitor 
 Lauri Silvennoinen (1916–2004), Finnish cross-country skier and Olympic medalist
 Lauri Valonen (1909–1982), Finnish Nordic combined skier, Olympic competitor

Wrestling
Lauri Haapanen (1889–1947), Finnish featherweight wrestler and Olympic competitor
Lauri Koskela (1907–1944), Finnish Greco-Roman wrestler and Olympic medalist

See also
 Lauri (surname)
 Laurie (given name)

Estonian masculine given names
Finnish masculine given names